This article is a list of opinion polls that have been taken for the 2012 South Korean presidential election. It is divided into polls for the presidential election itself, and polls for the primaries of the two main parties, Saenuri and the Democratic United Party. Two-way polls are used to demonstrate the popularity of one candidate with respect to the other, but the election itself will have no run-off round and will be held under a system of First Past the Post. The polls are ordered by date, with the newest at the top.

General election

Two-candidate race

Park Geun-hye vs. Ahn Cheol-soo

Park Geun-hye vs. Kim Doo-kwan

Park Geun-hye vs. Moon Jae-in

Park Geun-hye vs. Sohn Hak-kyu

Multiple-candidate race

Saenuri primary

DUP primary

References 

South Korea
2012 South Korean presidential election
Opinion polling in South Korea